Central University of South Bihar (CUSB) is one of the sixteen newly established Central Universities by the Government of India under the Central Universities Act, 2009 (Section 25 of 2009). The university is located at Panchanpur, Gaya, India. On 27 February 2014, Lok Sabha Speaker Meira Kumar laid the foundation stone for the permanent campus in Gaya. When completed, it will be spread in a 300-acre campus at Panchanpur. Currently further construction is ongoing. Dr. C. P. Thakur is now the newly appointed Chancellor by President of India and Kameshwar Nath Singh is the vice chancellor. CUSB is NAAC Accredited 'A' grade university.

Organisation and administration

Governance
The president of India is the visitor of the university. The chancellor is the ceremonial head of the university, while the executive powers rest with the vice-chancellor. The court, the executive council, the academic council, the board of studies and the finance committee are the administrative authorities of the university.

The University Court is the supreme authority of the university and has the power to review, the broad policies and programmes of the university and to suggest measures for the improvement and development of the university; the executive council is the highest executive body of the university. The academic council is the highest academic body of the university and is responsible for the  co-ordination and exercising general supervision over the academic policies of the university. It has the right to advise the executive council on all academic matters. The finance committee is responsible for recommending financial policies, goals, and budgets. 

The first chancellor is Meira Kumar, former Speaker of the Lok Sabha. H.C.S. Rathore is the vice-chancellor.

Academics
The university offers postgraduate and undergraduate programmes in various fields. Admission used to be through (CUCET)which is held by NTA, and in addition, in some cases, interview or group discussion. Now the university conducts an all India common entrance test re-christened as Central Universities Common Entrance Test (CUCET), across cities in India at viable examination centres.

Schools 
The university consists of the following schools:
 School of Earth, Biological and Environmental Sciences
 Centre for Biological Sciences                                                                                                                                                           
 Centre for Environmental Sciences                                                                                                                                                           
 School of Human Sciences
 Centre for Psychological Sciences
 School of Languages and Literature
 Centre for Foreign Languages
 Centre for Indian Languages
 School of Mathematics, Statistics and Computer Science
 Department of Computer Science
 Department of Mathematics
 Department of Statistics
 School of Media, Art & Aesthetics
 School of Social Sciences and Policy
 Centre for Development Studies
 Centre for Economic Studies and Policies
 Centre for Historical Studies and Archaeology
 Centre for Political Studies
 This centre offers a 2-year integrated M.A. programme in political science and international relations.
Ph.D. in political science and international relations
 Centre for Sociological Studies
 School of Education
 Centre for Education                                          
 School of Law and Governance
 The school of law and governance offers three courses now:
 5-year integrated B.A. LL.B. (Hons.) programme
 LL.M. one-year programme (as per UGC 2013 Regulation)
 Ph.D. in law
9. Department of Pharmacy (School of Health Sciences)

References

External links
 Central University of South Bihar Official Website
 CUCET  Official website

Central University of South Bihar
Central universities in India
Education in Gaya, India
2009 establishments in Bihar
Educational institutions established in 2009